The  (ORTF) was the national agency charged, between 1964 and 1975, with providing public radio and television in France.  All programming, and especially news broadcasts, were under strict control of the national government.

History

Background 
In 1945, the provisional French government established a public monopoly on broadcasting with the formation of Radiodiffusion Française (RDF).  This nationalisation of all private radio stations marked the beginning of a new era of state-controlled broadcasting in France. As part of its mandate, the RDF also established a 441-line television station known as Télévision française. This station made use of the frequencies previously utilised by the Nazi-operated Fernsehsender Paris.  

In 1949, the RDF underwent a name change to Radiodiffusion-Télévision Française (RTF) in order to reflect the organisation's growing focus on television broadcasting. By the end of the year, the RTF had begun transmitting television signals using the new 819-line system, which represented a significant advancement in the technical capabilities of the medium. This development allowed for the transmission of high-quality television signals and paved the way for the widespread adoption of television in France.

ORTF era 
In 1964, the RTF was itself reformed and renamed into the ORTF. The ORTF aimed to modernise the public broadcasting service in order to better satisfy the needs of the French public in terms of information, culture, education, and entertainment. Despite this goal of modernisation and an expressed commitment to meeting the diverse needs of the public, the ORTF continued to operate under a monopoly. 

From the beginning, the public broadcaster experienced fierce competition from the "peripheral stations": French-speaking stations aimed at the French public but transmitting on longwave from neighbouring countries, such as Radio Monte Carlo (RMC) from Monaco, Radio Luxembourg (later RTL) from Luxembourg, and Europe 1 from Germany (exceptionally, in 1974, RMC was allowed to set up a transmitter on French territory). 

In October 1967, colour television was introduced on the 625-line second channel. In 1968, advertising was introduced on both television channels, although the 'redevance audiovisuelle' (Broadcasting licence fee) remained in place.

ORTF employees participated in the May 1968 strikes.

In 1970, during a press conference, Georges Pompidou initiated a will to modernise, affirming that information provided to the ORTF must be free from any outside influence, independent in nature and impartial in its presentation, while stressing that it remains "the voice of France whether we like it or not. " 

A third television channel started broadcasting in December 1972.

Dissolution 
The election of Valéry Giscard d'Estaing in 1974 prompted yet another reform. The new liberal administration considered the ORTF to be a relic of Gaullist rule. Furthermore, the ORTF's annual budget had grown to an unsustainable 2.4 billion francs per year (approximately €2 billion in 2022), indicative of the organization's overly centralised structure. As a result, on December 31, 1974, law 74-696 (dated August 7, 1974) was implemented, splitting the ORTF into seven successor institutions:
Télévision Française 1 (TF1)
Antenne 2 (now France 2)
France Régions 3 (FR3) (now France 3)
SFP - Société Française de Production (programme production)
INA - Institut National de l'Audiovisuel (archives)
TDF - Télédiffusion de France (transmission)
Radio France - (Société Radio-France) French national and international radio
The changes however did not go into effect until January 6, 1975. Despite the dissolution of the ORTF, the public broadcasting monopoly continued to exist until 1981.

Today only INA and Radio France exist in their original form from 1975. Both TDF and TF1 were privatised (the latter sold to the Bouygues construction company) in 1987. The operations of Antenne 2 and FR3 were re-merged in the early 1990s, into a single entity known today as France Télévisions, which still remains under public ownership. SFP was privatised in 2001, and is now a part of Euro Média France.

Logo 
The design of the ORTF logo was mostly influenced by the "three ellipses" symbol of its predecessor, with the addition of the letter "O" to create a fourth ellipse. The logo evokes both the concept of radio waves and an image of an electron, symbolising the Atomic Age.

The ORTF logo prominently appeared during the startup and closedown sequences of their television channels.

Services 
When it was dissolved in 1975, the ORTF operated 3 national radio networks, 10 regional radio stations, and 3 television channels in Metropolitan France. It operated an additional 8 radio stations and 7 television stations in the overseas territories.

Metropolitan France

National radio 

 France Inter
 France Culture
 France Musique

Regional radio 

 Paris
 Marseille
 Reims
 Lorraine
 Bordeaux
 Lyon
 Côte d'Azur
 Lille
 Toulous
 Loire-Atlantique

National television 

 1re chaîne de l'ORTF (819-line VHF, monochrome only)
 2e chaîne de l'ORTF / 2e chaîne couleur (625-line UHF, colour available from October 1, 1967)
 3e chaîne couleur de l'ORTF (625-line UHF, colour available from launch)

Regional television 
The ORTF also operated 11 regional television services that provided programming for all three channels:

 Lille
 Strasbourg
 Marseille Provence
 Lyon
 Toulouse-Pyrénées
 Bordeaux Aquitaine
 Bretagne Loire-Océan
 Paris Normandie Centre
 Lorraine Champagne
 Limognes-Centre-Ouest
 Bourgogne Franche-Comté

Overseas Territories

Radio 

 Radio Saint-Denis
 Radio Saint-Pierre et Miquelon
 Radio Guadeloupe
 Radio Nouméa
 Radio Martinique
 Radio Tahiti
 Radio Guyane
 Radio Comores

Television 

 Télé Martinique
 Télé Guadeloupe
 Télé Réunion
 Télé Tahiti
 Télé Nouméa
 Télé Guyane
 Télé Saint-Pierre et Miquelon

The overseas stations were given to FR3 as part of the dissolution, and today form part of the La Première network.

Membership of the European Broadcasting Union
In 1950 the ORTF's predecessor, RTF, had been one of 23 founding broadcasting organisations of the European Broadcasting Union (EBU). Upon the break-up of the ORTF in 1974, French membership of the EBU was transferred to the transmission company TDF, while TF1 became a second French active member. A2, FR3, and SRF became supplementary active members before eventually becoming full members in 1982. In 1983 the French public broadcasters' membership was transferred to a joint organisation, the Organisme français de radiodiffusion et de télévision (OFRT). Nine years later, the OFRT was succeeded by the Groupement des Radiodiffuseurs Français de l’UER (GRF) which currently holds one of the French memberships of the EBU, alongside Europe 1. 

TF1 left the EBU in 2018. Private TV channel Canal+ served as an additional member between 1984 and 2018.

See also

 Radiodiffusion-Télévision Française , the predecessor organisation
 Musique concrète, which the ORTF continued to develop
 Conseil Supérieur de l'Audiovisuel, modern-day regulating authorities
 Groupe TF1, a successor organisation
 France Télévisions, a successor organisation
 Orchestre National de France, a symphony orchestra once under the administration of the ORTF

References

History of telecommunications in France
Public broadcasting in France
Radio in France
State media
Television channels and stations established in 1964
Television channels and stations disestablished in 1975
Television in France
Radio stations established in 1964
Radio stations disestablished in 1975
Defunct mass media in France